Scutellaria glabriuscula, commonly known as Georgia skullcap, is a flowering plant. It is a perennial dicot in the family Lamiaceae, and is part of the genus Scutellaria. It grows in the Florida panhandle and parts of Georgia, Mississippi, and Alabama.

References

glabriuscula
Flora of Florida